Agios Ilias (also Άγιος Ηλίας Λετρίνων - Agios Ilias Letrinon) is a village and community in the municipality of Pyrgos in western Elis, Greece. It was an independent community from 1919 until 1997.

See also
List of settlements in Elis

References

External links
 Page of the Agios Ilias settlement

Populated places in Elis